Kothamangalam, is a municipality in Ernakulam district of Kerala, India. The town is in the foothills of the Western Ghats, and is a part of the Idukki Lok Sabha constituency.

The town serves as the headquarters of a taluk and a municipality of the same name.

Geography 
Kothamangalam is situated in the eastern part of the Ernakulam district. According to the division of the geographical regions of Kerala, Kothamangalam is in a mid-land region. The general topography is hilly.

The Periyar, the largest river in Kerala, flows through the taluk. There are dams built across the Periyar at Edamalayar, Lower Periyar, and Bhoothathankettu for hydroelectricity generation and irrigation purposes. The current Kothamangalam region was historically known as Malakhachira. Kothamangalamar, a small river which flows through the town joins Kaliyar and Thodupuzhayar to form the Muvattupuzhayar, which is the second largest river in Ernakulam.

Demographics 
According to the 2011 Census of India, Kothamangalam had a total population of 114,574, 56,753 being males and 57,821 females. There are 30,067 households in the Kothamangalam municipality. The literacy rate of Kothamangalam Agglomeration is 95.24%, in comparison to the national urban average literacy in India of 85%. The literacy rate of males and females were 97.04% and 93.48% respectively. There were 98,398 who were literate, of which 49,412 were males and the remaining 48,986 were females.

Administration 
The Kothamangalam municipality was formed in 1978 and is the headquarters of the taluk. Elections to the local self bodies are held once every five years. From the elected municipal councilors, a chairman and vice-chairman are elected.

Kothamangalam is part of the Idukki Lok Sabha constituency; until 2009, it was part of Muvattupuzha Lok Sabha constituency. Kothamangalam is also represented in the Kerala Legislative Assembly as a constituency. The panchayats in Kothamangalam Taluk are Nellikuzhi, Kottapady, Pindimana, Varapetty, Pallarimangalam, Pothanikkad, Paingottoor, Kavalangad, Keerampara, Vadattupara, Kuttampuzha,
and Edamalakkudy.

Education

Transport

Air 
Cochin International Airport is located at Nedumbassery, and services both domestic and international flights. It is the first international airport in India to be built without central government funds, and is the world's first fully solar energy powered airport.

Villages 
 

Eramalloor
Keerampara
Kottappady
Kothamangalam
Kuttampuzha
Neriamangalam
Pidavoor
Pindimana
Pothanikkad
Thrikkariyoor
Varappetty

References

External links

Ernakulam District website

 
Cities and towns in Ernakulam district